The Ridgecrest Police Department is the agency responsible for law enforcement within the City of Ridgecrest, California. The headquarters is located at 100 West California Avenue. The city uses a nearby jail maintained by the Kern County Sheriff's Department.

See also
List of law enforcement agencies in California

References

External links
Ridgecrest Police Department

Municipal police departments of California